Carl Milles (23 June 1875 – 19 September 1955) was a Swedish sculptor. He was married to artist Olga Milles (née Granner) and brother to Ruth Milles and half-brother to the architect Evert Milles. Carl Milles sculpted the Gustaf Vasa statue at the Stockholm Nordic Museum, the Poseidon statue in Gothenburg, the Orpheus group outside the Stockholm Concert Hall, and the Fountain of Faith in Falls Church, Virginia. His home near Stockholm, Millesgården, became his resting place and is now a museum.

Biography 
He was born as Carl Wilhelm Emil Andersson, son of lieutenant August Emil Sebastian "Mille" Andersson (1843-1910) and his wife Walborg Alfhild Maria Tisell (1846-1879), at Lagga outside Uppsala in 1875.  In 1897 he made what he thought would be a temporary stop in Paris on his way to Chile, where he was due to manage a school of gymnastics. However, he remained in Paris, where he studied art, working in Auguste Rodin's studio and slowly gaining recognition as a sculptor. In 1904 he and Olga moved to Munich.  

Two years later they settled in Sweden, buying property on Herserud Cliff on Lidingö, a large island near Stockholm. Millesgården was built there between 1906 and 1908 as the sculptor's private residence and workspace. It was turned into a foundation and donated to the Swedish people in 1936.

In 1931, American publisher George Gough Booth brought Milles to Cranbrook Educational Community, in Bloomfield Hills, Michigan, to serve as his sculptor in residence. Part of Booth's arrangement with his principal artists was that they were expected to create major commissions outside the Cranbrook environment.

In 1938, for the 300th anniversary of the founding of New Sweden, the country commissioned a sculpture by Milles featuring a replica of the Kalmar Nyckel, the ship which originally brought the Swedish colonists to America. The sculpture is located at Fort Christina in Wilmington, Delaware, near the landing site where the colonists arrived in 1638.

In America he is best known for his fountains. Milles' fountain group The Wedding of the Waters in St. Louis symbolizes the Missouri and Mississippi Rivers merging just upstream. Commissioned in 1936 and unveiled in May 1940 to a crowd of about 3000 people, the fountain caused a local uproar because of its playful, irreverent, naked, and nearly cartoonish figures, and because Milles had conceived the group as a wedding party.  Local officials insisted that the name be changed to The Meeting of the Waters.

Outside Detroit's Frank Murphy Hall of Justice is a Carl Milles statue, The Hand of God, which was sculpted in honor of Frank Murphy, Detroit Mayor, Michigan Governor, and United States Supreme Court Associate Justice. The statue was placed on a pedestal with the help of sculptor Marshall Fredericks. The statue was commissioned by the United Automobile Workers, and paid for by individual donations from UAW members. The Global Award for Entrepreneurship Research, an annual award for research on entrepreneurship, consists of a replica statuette of The Hand of God and a prize of 100,000 euros.
Milles' sculptures sometimes offended American sensibilities, and he had a 'fig leaf' maker on retainer.

Photographs of his sculptures, taken for a monograph on Milles, are now held in the Carl Milles Photograph Collection, c. 1938–1939, in the Ryerson & Burnham Libraries at the Art Institute of Chicago.

Milles and his wife returned to Sweden in 1951, and lived in Millesgården every summer until Milles' death in 1955. They spent winters in Rome, where the American Academy had supplied them with a studio. Milles and his wife, Olga, who died in 1967 in Graz, Austria, are buried in a small stone chapel, designed by Milles, at Millesgården. Because Swedish law requires burial on sacred ground, it took the assistance of the then reigning Gustaf VI Adolf to allow this resting place.

Selected works 

 Aganippe Fountain, Metropolitan Museum of Art, New York City, 1951-1955 (at Brookgreen Gardens since 1982)
 Aviator Monument, Karlaplan, Stockholm, 1931
 Fountain of Faith, National Memorial Park cemetery, Falls Church, Virginia, 1939-1952 
 Gustav Vasa Statue, Nordic Museum, Stockholm, 1905-1907 (painted gypsum) and 1925 (painted oak)
 Folkung Fountain, Old Square, Linköping, 1924–1927
 Louis De Geer, Old Square, Norrköping, 1945
 Sten Sture Monument, Uppsala, 1902–1925
 Indian God of Peace, City Hall, Saint Paul, Minnesota, 1932–1936
 Bronze doors, Finance Building, Pennsylvania State Capitol Complex, Harrisburg, Pennsylvania, 1938
 Diana Fountain, Matchstick Palace, Stockholm, 1927–28
 Europe and the Bull Fountain, Stora Torg, Halmstad, 1924–1926
 Exterior sculpted decor of Sweden's Royal Dramatic Theatre, Stockholm, 1903–1908
 God on the Rainbow, Nacka, 1995 (by Marshall Fredericks, on a 1946 model by Milles for the Headquarters of the United Nations)
 Greendale War Memorial for Veterans of All Wars, Worcester, Massachusetts, 1948
 Man and Nature, lobby of 1 Rockefeller Plaza, Rockefeller Center, New York City, 1937–1941
 Man and Pegasus, Castle Park, Malmö, 1949
 Maritime Goddess, Helsingborg, 1921–1923
 Meeting of the Waters, monumental fountain, St. Louis, Missouri, 1936–1940
 Monument to Johannes Rudbeckius, Västerås, 1923
 Numerous works at Cranbrook Educational Community, Bloomfield Hills, Michigan, including Mermaids & Tritons Fountain, 1930, Sven Hedin on a Camel, 1932, Jonah and the Whale Fountain, 1932, Orpheus Fountain, 1936.
 On a Sunday Morning, monumental fountain, Ingalls Mall, University of Michigan, Ann Arbor, Michigan, 1939–1941
 Orpheus Group, in front of Stockholm Concert Hall, 1926–1936
 Playing Angels, Philadelphia, Pennsylvania, 1950 (purchased by Fairmount Park Art Association in 1968; installed 1972)
 Poseidon Fountain, Götaplatsen, Gothenburg, 1925–1931
 Saint Martin of Tours (William Volker Memorial Fountain), Kansas City, Missouri, 1950-1955
 Sjöguden (Sea God), Skeppsbron, Stockholm, 1913
 Spirit of Transportation, Detroit Civic Center, Detroit, Michigan, 1952
 Sun Singer, Helgeandsholmen, Stockholm, 1926; replicas in Robert Allerton Park, Monticello, Illinois, and National Memorial Gardens, Falls Church, Virginia
 Swedish Tercentenary Monument, Fort Christina, Wilmington, Delaware, 1937–38
 The Archer, in front of Liljevalchs konsthall, Stockholm, 1919
 The Astronomer, 1939 New York World's Fair, Flushing Meadows–Corona Park, 1938-39 (plaster, destroyed at the Fair's end; later reproduced in smaller-scale bronze)
 The Four Ages of Economic Exchange, Stockholms Enskilda Bank head office, Stockholm, 1915
The Hand of God, Eskilstuna, 1952-1954
 Two Dancers, 1915, placed on Gothenburg's Götaplatsen in 1952
 Two plaques on WWJ Building, Detroit, Michigan, 1936
 Wall reliefs on Racine County Courthouse, Racine, Wisconsin, 1931

Gallery

Sources and references 

 Jonsson, Ann, « D’un mythe à l’autre : L’ 'Europe' de Carl Milles et sa symbolique en Suède », in D'Europe à l'Europe, II. Mythe et identité du XIXe s. à nos jours (colloque de Caen, 1999), éd. Rémy Poignault, Françoise Lecocq et Odile Wattel – de Croizant, Tours, Centre Piganiol, coll. Caesarodunum, n° XXXIII bis, 2000, p. 157-162.
 Kvaran, Einar E., An Annoted Inventory of Outdoor Sculpture in Washtenaw County (Masters Thesis. 1989)
 Liden, Elisabeth, Between Water and Heaven, Carl Milles Search for American Commissions, (Almqvist & Wiksell International, Stockholm, Sweden 1986)
 Martenson, Gunilla, A Stockholm Sculpture Garden (New York Times, Dec. 27, 1987)
 Nawrocki, Dennis and Thomas Holleman, Art in Detroit Public Places, (Wayne State University Press, Detroit, Michigan 1980)
 Piland & Uguccioni, Fountains of Kansas City, (City of Fountains Foundation 1985)
 Rogers, Meyric, Carl Milles, An Interpretation of His Work, (Yale University Press, New Haven, Connecticut 1940)
 Taylor, Askew, Croze, et al., Milles At Cranbrook, (Cranbrook Academy of Art, 1961)
 Westbrook, Adele and Anne Yarowsky, Design in America, The Cranbrook Vision 1925–1950, (Detroit Institute)

See also 
 Marshall Fredericks

Notes

External links 

 Carl Milles, Detroit News Rearview Mirror
 Web sculpture museum

1875 births
1955 deaths
20th-century sculptors
Cranbrook Academy of Art faculty
Konstfack alumni
People from Knivsta Municipality
Recipients of the Prince Eugen Medal
Swedish male sculptors
Honorary Members of the Royal Academy